Catharina Petra Wilhelmina Johanna Stienen (born 8 May 1965) is a Dutch politician, writer and former diplomat. An Arabist by occupation, she was elected in June 2015 as a member of the Senate representing the Democrats 66 political party. Having been based in Egypt and Syria during her diplomatic career, she is known for her political commentary on the Arab world, particularly during the Arab Spring.

Early life and education
Petra Stienen was born in Roermond, Netherlands, in the neighbourhood of Donderberg. Her father was a house painter and her mother a housewife. She was the eldest of four children. She was raised a Roman Catholic. During her childhood, she worked as a babysitter and a strawberry picker for a canteen to earn extra money as her parents belonged to the working class.

She studied Arabic at Leiden University and Cairo University, and obtained a master's degree in Middle Eastern studies at the School of Oriental and African Studies in the United Kingdom.

Diplomatic career
She joined the Ministry of Foreign Affairs in 1995 as a diplomat and was stationed in Cairo until 1999, focusing on culture and human rights. From 1999 to 2004 she worked in Damascus, Syria, focusing on asylum and human rights issues. In 2004, she was recalled to the Netherlands where she served as senior policy official for the Dutch foreign ministry until 2005. From August 2005 to August 2009, she served as deputy head of the North America department in the ministry. Her diplomatic role and expertise was acknowledged by several authors in their respective publications.

Consultant, writer and commentator
In August 2009, Stienen quit her role and pursued a management consultancy career focused on non-governmental organizations, governments, and international companies. She then turned to printed media and has a column in the feminist magazine Opzij. She also regularly writes for NRC Handelsblad and de Volkskrant, among others. She has authored three books. Throughout this time period, she became a well-known television commentator on Middle Eastern politics, particularly during the Arab Spring. She regularly engages as a public speaker about the role of the Netherlands and Europe with regard to the Arab world, integration, and women's rights. In February 2010, she appeared alongside scholar Tariq Ramadan in a public discussion on "Is Europe Failing Its Muslims?" which was televised worldwide.

Political career
In the 2015 Dutch Senate election, Stienen was elected into the Dutch senate representing the social-liberal Democrats 66 party and was sworn in on 9 June 2015. Her legislative contribution includes passing the Environmental Act bill.

In addition to her role in the Senate, Stienen has been serving as member of the Dutch delegation to the Parliamentary Assembly of the Council of Europe since 2017. As member of the Alliance of Liberals and Democrats for Europe, she is currently a member of the Committee on Equality and Non-Discrimination and of the Committee on Migration, Refugees and Displaced Persons. In this capacity, she has served as the Assembly’s rapporteur on the gender dimension of foreign policy (2019) and on access to sexual and reproductive healthcare (2023).

Other activities
 Action For Hope, Member of the Board
 Masterpiece, Member of the Board 
 Care International, Member of the Board
 European Council on Foreign Relations (ECFR), Member of the Council

Awards and honours
In February 2012, Stienen was awarded the Women in the Media Award 2011 in recognition of her work. In 2016, Stienen was awarded the Aletta Jacobs Prize by the University of Groningen for "using her work to represent and transmit the voices of women who would otherwise not be heard".

Personal life
Stienen is a vegetarian, having not eaten meat since age sixteen. She currently resides in The Hague.

Publications
Dromen van een Arabische lente. Een Nederlandse diplomate in het Midden-Oosten (English:Dreaming of an Arab spring. A Dutch diplomat in the Middle East). New Amsterdam , Amsterdam, 2008. 
Het andere Arabische geluid. Een nieuwe toekomst voor het Midden-Oosten? (English:The other Arabic sound. A new future for the Middle East?). New Amsterdam, Amsterdam, 2012. 
Terug naar de Donderberg. Portret van een wereldwijk (English: Back to the Donderberg. Portrait of a world district). New Amsterdam, Amsterdam, 2015.

References

External links
Official website
Official Twitter page

1965 births
Living people
20th-century Dutch diplomats
21st-century Dutch diplomats
21st-century Dutch non-fiction writers
21st-century Dutch politicians
21st-century Dutch women politicians
21st-century Dutch women writers
Alumni of SOAS University of London
Cairo University alumni
Democrats 66 politicians
Dutch Arabists
Dutch columnists
Dutch women columnists
Dutch management consultants
Dutch political commentators
Leiden University alumni
Members of the Senate (Netherlands)
People from Roermond
20th-century Dutch women